The White Park is a rare breed of ancient horned cattle primarily residing in Great Britain. Two similar semi-feral populations, the Chillingham Wild Cattle in Northumbria and the Vaynol cattle from Gwynedd in North Wales, have a separate breed status. There are relatively small numbers of the White Park cattle in the United States, where they are commonly known as the Ancient White Park in order to distinguish them from the American White Park, which is a population of the British White breed.

Description
The White Park is a medium-large, long-bodied bovine. A program of linear assessment, including 200 bulls and 300 cows, has been carried out in the UK since 1994 to define its size and conformation. Their coloration is a distinctive porcelain white with coloured (black or red) points. The horns of the cows can vary in shape, but the majority grow forwards and upwards in a graceful curve. The horns of the bulls are thicker and shorter. In their native environment in Britain, White Park cattle are known for their distinctive appearance and their grazing preference for coarse terrain. White Park cattle are well-suited to non-intensive production. Some herds are kept outside throughout the year on rough upland grazing without shelter or supplementary feed. They are docile, easy-calving, and have a long productive life. Some traits may vary depending on their location.
Until recently, White Park cattle were a triple-purpose breed used for meat, milk and draught. The 3rd Lord Dynevor (1765–1852) kept a team of draught oxen, and the practice continued up to 1914. They were used as dairy cattle even more recently. Some cows were being milked in the Dynevor herd in 1951, but yields were moderate. Beef became the main product during the twentieth century, and gained a reputation as a textured meat, with excellent flavor and marbling, which commanded a significant premium in specialty markets. 

Several blood typing and DNA studies have revealed the genetic distinctness of White Park cattle. The breeds most closely related seem to be the Highland cattle and Galloway cattle of Scotland, but the White Park "is genetically far distant from all British breeds".

The Chillingham breed has diverged from the main White Park population and various stories have grown up around them.

History

In 1225, as a result of legislation passed by Henry III, several parks were enclosed and several herds, including those at Chartley and Chillingham in England, and Cadzow in Scotland, were "emparked".  There were more than a dozen white Park Cattle herds in Britain in the early 19th century, but most of these were exterminated by the turn of the next century.

The Park Cattle registration program in Britain was started in the early 1900s, but by 1946 only the Dynevor, Woburn, Whipsnade, and Cadzow herds survived as domesticated herds; the ancient herds at Vaynol (Faenol) and Chillingham having become semi-feral. Registration of White Park Cattle lapsed in the 1940s due to the outbreak of World War II. Later in 1973, the Rare Breeds Survival Trust was formed in Britain, and the following year the registration program was revived for the remaining British herds in the "White Park" herd book. Numbers have increased and now exceed 1,000 breeding cows in the UK.

White Park cattle have been exported to several countries. In 1921, animals were exported to Denmark, and from there to Latvia in 1935 and thence to Germany in 1972. In 1987, cattle were exported to Australia. In 1940, one or two pairs of White Park cattle from the Callow herd were exported to Canada. The Canadian-born offspring of those cattle were transferred to the Bronx Zoo but moved to the King Ranch in Texas where they remained for almost the next forty years. In USA the breed is known as Ancient White Park to avoid confusion with the hornless American White Park.

Most national populations of White Park cattle have been DNA tested to verify parentage, to confirm the provenance of products, and to enable assignment of applicant animals to breed and determine the optimum breeding program to ensure their effective conservation survival. The breeding program in the UK aims to increase the desirable characteristics of the breed while maintaining genetic diversity, as heterogeneity is low due to inbreeding through much of the twentieth century. Faygate Brace (born 1906) contributed  of the ancestry of the breed by the 1940s, and Whipsnade 281 (born 1956) repeated this pattern in the second half of the twentieth century. His grandson, Dynevor Torpedo is now the dominant influence in the breed. Two herds, Dynevor and Chartley/Woburn, have been the dominant influences throughout this time. The global population now is almost 2,000 purebred females, plus bulls and young stock.

See also
Finnbhennach ("White-Horned", a bull featured in Táin Bó Cuailnge)
Chillingham cattle
Vaynol cattle
List of breeds of cattle

References

Further reading

External links 

White Park Cattle Society website
BBC News: A new herd of White Park Cattle established on the Isle of Man, November 2013
Animal Symbolism in Celtic Mythology. A paper for Religion 375 at the University of Michigan by Lars Noodén, 22 November 1992

Cattle breeds
Cattle breeds originating in the United Kingdom
Cattle breeds originating in Ireland
Conservation Priority Breeds of the Livestock Conservancy
Animal breeds on the RBST Watchlist